Galor may refer to:  

 Galor (surname)

See also 
 Galor, fictional starship of Cardassian Galor class in Star Trek franchise